Dombhát is the Hungarian name for three villages in Romania:

 Anieş village, Maieru Commune, Bistriţa-Năsăud County
 Dealu Mare village, Coroieni Commune, Maramureș County
 Dealu Corbului village, Vima Mică Commune, Maramureș County